"I'm Casting My Lasso Towards the Sky" is a song written by Lee "Lasses" White and Jimmy Wakely.

Slim Whitman recorded it for RCA Victor. It was released as a single, with "I'll Do as Much for You Someday" on the flip side, in April 1949.

Lyrics 
It is a romantic cowboy song.

History 
In 1948, Slim Whitman signed with RCA Vctor. It was his wife Jerry who suggested this song for his first recording session at the label that took place somewhere in 1948 or 1949. It was released as a single, with "I'll Do as Much for You Someday" on the flip side, in April 1949.

Billboard in its April 30 issue reviewed the single and rated it as "satisfactory", chosing "I'm Casting My Lasso Towards the Sky" as the better of the two sides. The comment on the song read: "Western yodellng and warbling with lively ork backing. Tune is not likely to appeal widely."

The song was a moderate success and became Whitman's theme song.

After the singer hit it big on Imperial, RCA Victor hastily issued several singles with his old recordings for the label to cash off of his popularity. The 1953 RCA Victor single "I'm Casting My Lasso Towards the Sky" was even coupled with the same song as the then-latest Whitman's single for Imperial.

Track listing

References 

1949 songs
1949 singles
RCA Victor singles
1956 singles
London Records singles
Slim Whitman songs
Songs written by Lee "Lasses" White
Songs written by Jimmy Wakely